Joseph Charles Doumba (2 February 1936 – 5 March 2017) was a Cameroonian politician. First appointed to the government of Cameroon as Minister of Information and Culture in 1974, Doumba was Secretary-General of the Cameroon People's Democratic Movement (RDPC) from 1992 to 2007.

RDPC Secretary-General
Doumba was designated as Secretary-General of the RDPC, the ruling party, on 10 March 1992. He was viewed as strongly loyal to President Paul Biya.

Doumba and RDPC Deputy Secretary-General Gregoire Owona had a poor relationship; by 2003 they had reportedly not been on speaking terms for years, and Biya was said to primarily work with Owona, while largely ignoring Doumba. Doumba's health was poor by that time, and he was often in France for medical treatment; he also faced discontent within the party due a perception that he was aloof from the party at the local level, and he was accused of ignoring the Central Committee. Rumors in May 2003 suggested that he had tried to resign but that Biya had refused to accept his resignation.

Doumba's poor health was highlighted by the visible difficulty he had in giving a speech at an RDPC extraordinary congress in July 2006. Due to the state of his health, party affairs were largely managed by Owona until Biya, in his capacity as National President of the RDPC, appointed Rene Sadi to succeed Doumba on 4 April 2007. On the same occasion, he appointed Doumba as Roving Ambassador at the Presidency.

References

1936 births
2017 deaths
Government ministers of Cameroon
Cameroon People's Democratic Movement politicians